Lee Jang-kun (Hangul: 이장군) is a South Korean professional Kabaddi player and television personality. 
He is the first overseas player in Pro Kabaddi League to score 400 raid points. He became the most valuable international player In season 5 after he was retained by Bengal Warriors, and he played for the same franchise until the 2018-19 Pro Kabaddi League season. He Joined the Patna Pirates in the 7th season of the Pro Kabaddi League. He is the most successful foreign raider in the history of Pro Kabaddi League.

Career

Lee started his kabaddi career at the age of 18 when he was  preparing for studying physical education at college. In two years, he was selected for the South Korean national kabaddi team as a junior at Dong-eui University.

After winning bronze as a member of the national team at the 2013 Asian Indoor and Martial Arts Games, Lee captured his first top-level international medal at the 2014 Asian Games where South Korea clinched bronze in the men's kabaddi tournament. After the Asian Games Lee moved to India to join Pro Kabaddi League. He became a valuable player for his team afterwards.

Career statistics

Filmography

Television Shows

References

External links
Lee Jang-kun at bengalwarriors.com

Living people
South Korean kabaddi players
Pro Kabaddi League players
1992 births
People from Busan
Asian Games medalists in kabaddi
Kabaddi players at the 2014 Asian Games
Kabaddi players at the 2018 Asian Games
Asian Games silver medalists for South Korea
Asian Games bronze medalists for South Korea
Medalists at the 2014 Asian Games
Medalists at the 2018 Asian Games
Dong-a University alumni
South Korean expatriate sportspeople in India